is a 1961 action comedy film directed by Kinji Fukasaku and starring Sonny Chiba. It was followed by a sequel, Hepcat in the Funky Hat: The 20,000,000 Yen Arm, which was released one month later that same year and was also directed by Kinji Fukasaku and starring Sonny Chiba.

Plot
Mr. Tenka runs a detective agency. His unruly son Ichiro ends up getting mixed up in a mystery.

Cast
Sonny Chiba as Ichiro Tenka
Rikiya Iwaki as Kondo

Production
The film was shot in black and white with mono sound.

Release
Its title has been translated as Vigilante in the Funky Hat, Hepcat with a Funky Hat, and Man with the Funky Hat.

Sequel
The film was followed by a sequel, Hepcat in the Funky Hat: The 20,000,000 Yen Arm, released in Japan one month later on September 13, 1961.

Reception
Mikko Koivisto of elitisti gave the film a score of 3.5/5, calling it "an enjoyable piece of the early history of the promising young director and actor".

References

External links 
 

1964 films
1960s action comedy films
1960s crime action films
1960s crime comedy films
Films directed by Kinji Fukasaku
Films set in Tokyo
1960s Japanese-language films
Japanese action comedy films
Japanese black-and-white films
Japanese crime comedy films
Japanese detective films
Toei Company films
1960s Japanese films